The 2014 Canadian Mixed Doubles Curling Trials was held March 19 to 23 at the Ottawa Hunt and Golf Club in Ottawa, Ontario. It is the second Canadian Mixed Doubles championship. The winning pair of Wayne Tuck Jr. and wife Kim Tuck represented Canada at the 2014 World Mixed Doubles Curling Championship.

Teams
Twelve teams qualified through provincial and territorial championships, and the rest participated as open entries. The teams are listed as follows:

Provincial and Territorial champions

Open entries

Round robin standings
Final Round Robin Standings

Playoffs

Round of 12
Saturday, March 22, 9:30 pm

Quarterfinals
Sunday, March 23, 11:00 am

Semifinals
Sunday, March 23, 2:00 pm

Final
Sunday, March 23, 5:00 pm

References

External links
 (web archive)

Canadian Mixed Doubles Curling Championship
2014 in Canadian curling
Curling in Ottawa
Canadian Mixed Doubles Curling Trials
2010s in Ottawa
Canadian Mixed Doubles Curling Trials